The 2000 Chevrolet Monte Carlo 400 was the 25th stock car race of the 2000 NASCAR Winston Cup Series and the 40th iteration of the event. The race was held on Saturday, September 9, 2000, in Richmond, Virginia, at Richmond International Raceway, a 0.75 miles (1.21 km) D-shaped oval. The race took the scheduled 400 laps to complete. At race's end, Jeff Gordon, driving for Hendrick Motorsports, would manage to pull away on the final restart with 15 to go to win his 52nd career NASCAR Winston Cup Series win and his third and final win of the season. To fill out the podium, Dale Earnhardt of Richard Childress Racing and Mark Martin of Roush Racing would finish second and third, respectively.

Background 

Richmond International Raceway (RIR) is a 3/4-mile (1.2 km), D-shaped, asphalt race track located just outside Richmond, Virginia in Henrico County. It hosts the Monster Energy NASCAR Cup Series and Xfinity Series. Known as "America's premier short track", it formerly hosted a NASCAR Camping World Truck Series race, an IndyCar Series race, and two USAC sprint car races.

Entry list 

 (R) denotes rookie driver.

Practice

First practice 
The first practice session was held on Friday, September 8, at 12:30 PM EST. The session would last for one hours and 25 minutes.

Second practice 
The second practice session was held on Friday, September 8, at 3:00 PM EST. The session would last for one hour and 30 minutes.

Third practice 
The third practice session was held on Saturday, September 9, at 11:30 AM EST. The session would last for one hour.

Fourth and final practice 
The final practice session, sometimes referred to as Happy Hour, was held after second-round qualifying. The session would last until 2:20 PM EST.

Qualifying 
Qualifying was split into two rounds. The first round was held on Friday, September 8, at 5:30 PM EST. Each driver would have two laps to set a fastest time; the fastest of the two would count as their official qualifying lap. During the first round, the top 25 drivers in the round would be guaranteed a starting spot in the race. If a driver was not able to guarantee a spot in the first round, they had the option to scrub their time from the first round and try and run a faster lap time in a second round qualifying run, held on Saturday, September 9, at 1:15 PM EST. As with the first round, each driver would have two laps to set a fastest time; the fastest of the two would count as their official qualifying lap. Positions 26-36 would be decided on time, while positions 37-43 would be based on provisionals. Six spots are awarded by the use of provisionals based on owner's points. The seventh is awarded to a past champion who has not otherwise qualified for the race. If no past champion needs the provisional, the next team in the owner points will be awarded a provisional.

Four drivers would fail to qualify: Mike Bliss, Robby Gordon, Darrell Waltrip, and Dave Marcis.

Full qualifying results

Race results

References 

2000 NASCAR Winston Cup Series
NASCAR races at Richmond Raceway
September 2000 sports events in the United States
2000 in sports in Virginia